Activating transcription factor 5, also known as ATF5, is a protein that, in humans, is encoded by the ATF5 gene.

Function 

First described by Nishizawa and Nagata, ATF5 has been classified as a member of the activating transcription factor (ATF)/cAMP response-element binding protein (CREB) family.

ATF5 transcripts and protein are expressed in a wide variety of tissues, in particular, high expression of transcripts in liver. It is also present in a variety of tumor cell types.

ATF5 expression is regulated at both the transcriptional and translational level.

ATF5 is expressed in VZ and SVZ during brain development.

The human ATF5 protein is made up of 282 amino acids.

ATF5 is a transcription factor that contains a bZip domain.

See also 
 Activating transcription factor

Interactions 
ATF5 has been shown to interact with DISC1 and TRIB3.

References

Further reading

External links 
 
 

Transcription factors
Biology of bipolar disorder